Queen's County was a federal electoral district in Prince Edward Island, Canada, that was represented in the House of Commons of Canada from 1873 to 1896.

This riding was created in 1873 when Prince Edward Island joined the Canadian Confederation.

It was abolished in 1892 when it was redistributed into East Prince, East Queen's and West Queen's ridings.

It consisted of Queen's County, and elected two members.

Election results

See also 
 List of Canadian federal electoral districts
 Past Canadian electoral districts

External links 
Riding history for Queen's County (1873–1892) from the Library of Parliament

Former federal electoral districts of Prince Edward Island